The history of the Jews in Kharkiv dates to at least 1734, when the Russian Empire allowed Jewish merchants to visit the city to engage in retail and trade.

History

As Kharkiv was located outside of the Pale of Settlement, Jewish residence was strictly controlled by the Russian government. Jews lost the right to enter the city in 1821, but regained that right in 1835 when the Governor of the Kharkov Governorate complained about the loss of more than 10 million rubles in revenue. Between 1855 and 1881, during the rule of Alexander II, a policy of selective emigration encouraged the migration of "useful" Jews to the city. By the late 19th century, the city had become a prominent center for the Zionist movement in Russia. The Jewish population significantly increased during the Soviet era, when Kharkiv's Jewish community doubled from 65,000 to 130,000 between 1923 and 1939. The main Jewish districts during the Soviet era were Kaganovichskii, Oktiabr’skii, Leninskii, and Dzerzhinskii. Despite the presence of the anti-Zionist Yevsektsiya, Kharkiv was home to Hebrew schools, printing presses, and political organizations including Conferences of He-Ḥaluts (1920) and Ha-Shomer ha-Tsa‘ir (1923). The Kharkov Kombund, the local affiliate of the anti-Zionist Bund, had a small presence in the city. During the Holocaust, when Ukraine was occupied by the Nazi Reichskommissariat, thousands of Jews were murdered in Kharkiv. 15,000 Jews were murdered by the Nazis at Drobytsky Yar. Following World War II, the community saw a renewal, and by 1959 there were 84,000 Jews living in the city. However, Soviet repression of Jewish religion and culture had led to the liquidation of the Jewish theater in 1949, the closure of the last remaining synagogue in 1948–1949, and the arrest of Kharkiv's Rabbi Shmuel Lev in 1950. During the 1960s and 1970s, Jews were persecuted for trying to celebrate the High Holidays. Later during perestroika, the city began to see a revival of Judaism and Jewish culture. The Kharkiv Choral Synagogue, which had been confiscated by the Soviet government at the urging of Jewish Communists, was reopened as a synagogue in 1990. During the 1990s post-Soviet aliyah, many Jews from Kharkiv emigrated to Israel or to Western countries. By 2000, Kharkiv was home to 50,000 Jews.

Demographics
By the early 20th century, Kharkiv was home to around 11,000 Jews.

Notable Jews from Kharkiv
Polina Bayvel, a British engineer and academic.
Gary Berkovich, a Soviet and American architect.
Larisa Bogoraz, a dissident in the Soviet Union.
Viktor Fainberg,  a philologist and prominent figure of the dissident movement in the Soviet Union.
Oleksandr Feldman, a Ukrainian politician and public figure.
Roman Ghirshman, a Ukrainian-born French archeologist who specialized in ancient Persia.
Igor Guberman, a Russian-Israeli writer and poet.
Yevgeny Komarovsky, a Soviet and Ukrainian pediatrician, doctor of the highest category, writer, and TV presenter.
Leib Kvitko, a prominent Yiddish poet, an author of well-known children's poems and a member of the Jewish Anti-Fascist Committee (JAC).
Léo Lania, a journalist, playwright and screenwriter.
Evsei Liberman, a Soviet economist.
Boris Lozhkin, a Ukrainian businessperson and philanthropist.
Yeremey Parnov, a Soviet and Jewish Russian writer and publicist.
Olga Rapay-Markish, a prominent Ukrainian ceramicist.
Ida Rubinstein, a Russian dancer, actress, art patron and Belle Époque figure.
Karina Smirnoff, a Soviet-born American professional ballroom dancer of Ukrainian origins.
Konstantin Shayne, a Russian-American actor.
Jura Soyfer, an Austrian political journalist and cabaret writer.
Nadezhda Volkova, a courier in an underground Komsomol cell during the Second World War.
Eduard Volodarsky, a Soviet and Russian screenwriter, writer and playwright.
Yigal Yasinov, a former Israeli politician who served as a member of the Knesset.
Lazar Zalkind, a Jewish Ukrainian economist and chess problemist.

See also
Der Komunist (Kharkov)
Der shtern (Kharkov)
Drobytsky Yar
History of the Jews in Russia
History of the Jews in the Soviet Union
Kharkov Klezmer Band
Zai Greit!

References

Jewish Russian and Soviet history
Kharkiv
 
Jewish